The Crystal Skate of Romania is an annual senior-level international figure skating competition, held in Romania. Medals are awarded in the disciplines of men's singles, ladies' singles, and sometimes ice dancing. The event has been held annually since 1999 and was also used in certain years as the Romanian National Championships.

Senior medalists

Men

Ladies

Ice dancing

Junior medalists

Men

Ladies

References

External links
 1999 results
 2000 results
 2001 results
 2002 results
 2003 results
 2005 results
 2007 results
 2008 results
 2009 results

 
Figure skating competitions
Figure skating in Romania